Robert Sadin is an American jazz musician, conductor, arranger, composer and producer. He was conductor of the Lincoln Center Jazz Orchestra.

Discography

As leader
 Art of Love: Music of Machaut (Deutsche Grammophon, 2009)

As producer
 Kathleen Battle, So Many Stars (Sony Classical, 1995)
 Kathleen Battle, Grace (Sony Classical, 1997)
 Samuel Blaser, Consort in Motion (Kind of Blue, 2011)
 Dee Dee Bridgewater and Hollywood Bowl Orchestra, Prelude to a Kiss (Philips, 1996)
 The Clark Sisters, Conqueror (Rejoice/A&M, 1988)
 Placido Domingo, Encanto del Mar (Sony Classical, 2014)
 Fleurine, Fire (Coast to Coast, 2002)
 Herbie Hancock, Gershwin's World (Verve, 1998)
 Tom Harrell, First Impressions (HighNote, 2015)
 Igor Lumpert, Eleven (Clean Feed, 2018)
 New York Voices, Hearts of Fire (GRP, 1991)
 Jacques Schwarz-Bart, Sone Ka-La (EmArcy, 2006)
 Wayne Shorter, Alegria (Verve, 2003)
 Sting, If on a Winter's Night (Cherrytree/Deutsche Grammophon, 2009)

References

American jazz musicians
Living people
Year of birth missing (living people)
21st-century American conductors (music)